Musquito (c. 1780, Port Jackson – 25 February 1825, Hobart) (also rendered Mosquito, Musquetta, Bush Muschetta or Muskito) was an Indigenous Australian resistance leader, latterly based in Van Diemen's Land.

New South Wales and Norfolk Island 
Musquito of the Gai-Mariagal clan, was born in Hawkesbury/Broken Bay region of Sydney.

Musquito engaged in violent raids on British settlements in the Hawkesbury and Georges River areas in 1805. The Sydney Gazette reported that he committed to further raids "in good English"; on 9 June 1805 the colony authorities authorised his arrest.

He was captured by local Aboriginal people in July 1805 and gaoled in Parramatta, but not charged. Governor Philip Gidley King exiled him and a fellow "principal" in the raiding, "Bull Dog", to the convict colony on Norfolk Island.

As part of the evacuation of Norfolk Island, Musquito was sent in January 1813 on the ship Minstrel with other convicts to Port Dalrymple in what was then called Van Diemen's Land.

To Van Diemen's Land 
In 1814, Musquito's brother Philip convinced governor Lachlan Macquarie to allow Musquito to return to Sydney, but Musquito remained in Van Diemen's Land.

Musquito worked as an Aboriginal tracker of bushrangers. For his services as a tracker of bushrangers, Musquito was promised repatriation to Sydney by lieutenant-governor William Sorell in 1817, but this did not occur.

By February 1818 he was a servant of the prominent and wealthy settler and entrepreneur, Edward Lord, and some sources say that in October 1818 he helped track and kill bushranger Michael Howe.

Ostracised by the convicts, and disillusioned by Sorell's broken promise to return Musquito to Sydney, Musquito decided to leave the settlement for the bush.

The "tame gang", raids and execution 
Musquito formed the "tame gang", of 20 to 30 companions, and joined the Oyster Bay tribe (of Great Oyster Bay). In November 1823 and later in 1824, Musquito and the tame gang raided farms on the east coast of Tasmania and killed several stockmen. In August 1824, he was captured and wounded by Tegg (also rendered Teague), an Aboriginal boy.

Musquito was charged with aiding and abetting the murder of a Tahitian farm hand named Mammoa and settler George Meredith's servant, William Hollyoak, at Grindstone Bay, and tried in December 1824 along with a comrade called "Black Jack". Musquito was found guilty of the death of Hollyoak, but not of Mammoa, and was sentenced to death by hanging. The sentence was carried out at Old Hobart Gaol on 25 February 1825.

Historian Naomi Parry describes the evidence arrayed against Musquito for aiding and abetting as "dubious" and says that after his death it "remained unclear whether Musquito committed any murders". Musquito's contemporary Henry Melville called the conviction a "most extraordinary precedent" and Gilbert Robertson said it provoked further violence.

See also 
 Pemulwuy a warrior and resistance leader of the Bidjigal clan of the Eora people, in the area around Sydney
 Tarenorerer, also known as Walyer, Waloa or Walloa was a rebel leader of the Indigenous Australians in Tasmania
 Tunnerminnerwait was an Australian aboriginal resistance fighter and Parperloihener clansman from Tasmania
 Australian frontier wars
Barangaroo historian

References

From schools

External links
Australian Dictionary of Biography

Indigenous Australian bushrangers
Australian outlaws
1780 births
1825 deaths
19th-century Australian people
Van Diemen's Land people